Gran Premio de San José is a one-day road cycling race held annually since 2016. It is part of UCI America Tour in category 1.2.

Winners

References

Cycle racing in Costa Rica
UCI America Tour races
Recurring sporting events established in 2016